Within the context of diplomatic relations between Afghanistan and Japan, Afghanistan has appointed an envoy to Japan intermittently since 1933, under the title of either ambassador or chargé d'affaires.

References

Japan
Afghanistan